The 2008 Valencian Community motorcycle Grand Prix was the last round of the 2008 MotoGP championship. It took place on the weekend of 24–26 October 2008 at the Circuit Ricardo Tormo.

MotoGP classification

250 cc classification

125 cc classification

Championship standings after the race (MotoGP)

Below are the standings for the top five riders and constructors after round eighteen has concluded. 

Riders' Championship standings

Constructors' Championship standings

 Note: Only the top five positions are included for both sets of standings.

References

Valencian Community motorcycle Grand Prix
Valencian
Valencian motorcycle
21st century in Valencia